Lucía Yamileth Yépez Guzman (born 18 February 2001) is an Ecuadorian freestyle wrestler. She won the gold medal in the 53 kg event at the 2021 U23 World Wrestling Championships held in Belgrade, Serbia.

She competed for Ecuador at the 2020 Summer Olympics in Tokyo, Japan. A few months later, she won the gold medal in the women's 50kg event at the 2021 Junior Pan American Games held in Cali, Colombia.

She won the gold medal in her event at the 2022 Bolivarian Games held in Valledupar, Colombia. She competed in the 53kg event at the 2022 World Wrestling Championships held in Belgrade, Serbia. She won the gold medal in her event at the 2022 South American Games held in Asunción, Paraguay.

She won the gold medal in her event at the 2023 Ibrahim Moustafa Tournament held in Alexandria, Egypt.

Achievements

References

External links 

 

Living people
2001 births
Ecuadorian female sport wrestlers
Wrestlers at the 2020 Summer Olympics
Olympic wrestlers of Ecuador
Pan American Wrestling Championships medalists
Competitors at the 2022 South American Games
South American Games medalists in wrestling
South American Games gold medalists for Ecuador
21st-century Ecuadorian women